Kenneth Mason Easley Jr. (born January 15, 1959) is an American former professional football player who was a strong safety in the National Football League (NFL) for seven seasons during the 1980s. He played college football for the UCLA Bruins and was a three-time consensus All-American. A first-round pick in the 1981 NFL Draft, Easley played professionally for the NFL's Seattle Seahawks from 1981 to 1987. Easley has been considered to be among the best defensive backs during his era and one of the Seahawks' all-time greatest players.

Easley was one of Seahawks' defensive unit leaders and one of the finest defensive players in the NFL during the 1980s. In 1984, Easley was named the NFL Defensive Player of the Year by the Associated Press. He was a four-time All–Pro selection and was elected to the Pro Bowl five times in his career. Easley's career ended after the 1987 season, when he was diagnosed with severe kidney disease.

After retirement, Easley owned a Cadillac dealership and later, the Norfolk Nighthawks AF2 team from 1999 to 2003. In 1998, he was inducted into the Virginia Sports Hall of Fame. In 2017, he was voted into the Pro Football Hall of Fame.

Early years
Born and raised in Chesapeake, Virginia, Easley graduated from its Oscar F. Smith High School in 1977. He was the first player in the history of Virginia high school football to rush and pass for over 1,000 yards in a single season, and was named as an all-state and All-American selection at quarterback. In 1996, Oscar F. Smith High School honored Easley and two other football graduates Ed Beard and Steve DeLong by naming its football stadium "Beard–DeLong–Easley Field" on September 6.

College career
Allegedly recruited by 350 colleges, Easley selected University of California, Los Angeles (UCLA) and played for the Bruins football team. He started ten games as a true freshman in 1977, recording nine interceptions and was named to his first all Pac-10 squad. His 93 tackles established a school-record for tackles by a true freshman. Later, he became the first player in conference history to be honored as all-conference for four consecutive years. Playing from 1977 to 1980, Easley finished his college career with a school-record 19 interceptions and 324 tackles, along with 45 punt returns for 454 yards.

Easley was a three-time consensus All-American selection (1978, 1979, 1980) and finished ninth in the Heisman Trophy balloting in 1980. His No. 5 jersey was retired by the Bruins, and in 1991 he was elected to the UCLA Athletics Hall of Fame and the College Football Hall of Fame. He also played basketball at the junior varsity level for UCLA and was selected by the Chicago Bulls in the tenth round of the 1981 NBA Draft but did not play.

Professional career
Easley was the fourth overall pick of the 1981 NFL Draft, selected by the Seattle Seahawks. He became an immediate starter as a rookie in 1981, recording three interceptions for 155 yards and one touchdown, earning him AFC Defensive Rookie of the Year honors. In 1983, the Seahawks hired former Buffalo Bills coach Chuck Knox as their head coach and Easley immediately became the "backbone" of Knox's defense. In his first season playing for Knox, Easley won the AFC Defensive Player of the Year Award and recorded seven interceptions. In 1984, Easley led the NFL in interceptions with ten, which tied a club record. He returned two of them for touchdowns and was named as the NFL Defensive Player of the Year, the first safety awarded since Dick Anderson in 1973. In 1984, during a 45–0 win over the Kansas City Chiefs in the Kingdome on November 4, the Seahawks returned four interceptions for touchdowns, including one caught by Easley, breaking the record for most touchdowns scored from an interception in a game. He also took over the role of the team's main punt returner when Paul Johns got injured earlier in the season.

After the season, Easley signed a five-year contract to stay with the Seahawks, averaging $650,000 a year plus incentives. The contract made him one of the highest paid defensive players in the league. In 1985, Easley was selected for his fourth consecutive Pro Bowl, a team record until defensive tackle Cortez Kennedy was selected for his fifth consecutive Pro Bowl in 1995.

Easley was injured for most of the 1986 season; he hurt his knee against the San Diego Chargers on October 11, and the next month, missed the remainder of the season due to ankle surgery.

In 1987, Easley was the Seahawks player representative and a leading figure in the 1987 NFL strike. Seeking a new collective bargaining agreement with free agency a major factor, the head of the National Football League Players Association Gene Upshaw managed to convince Easley and hundreds of his fellow NFL players to go on strike. As a response, the league decided to use replacement players to fill up their rosters, along with a few veterans who crossed the "picket line". When former teammate Jim Zorn offered his services to the Seahawks, Easley said

Easley also warned his fellow players that he was against the idea of using violence against the replacement players in order to prove a point. Once the strike ended, Easley had an off-year as the Seahawks passing defense fell to 25th in the league. His last game was a 23–20 overtime loss to the Houston Oilers in the wild card game of the 1987 NFL playoffs.

Trade and retirement
Prior to the 1988 season, the Seahawks offered Easley to several clubs in an attempt to get a quarterback in return. Easley's declining play, which was partially blamed on his work during the strike and the blossoming of Easley's backup Paul Moyer, had made Easley expendable. On April 22, 1988, the Seahawks traded Easley to the Phoenix Cardinals for quarterback Kelly Stouffer. During the mandatory team physical, Easley was diagnosed with idiopathic nephrotic syndrome, a severe kidney disease that voided the trade. Easley had told Moyer that he thought his days with the Seahawks were numbered because of his involvement in the player's strike. He was not surprised when the trade happened but the kidney diagnosis had "shocked" him. The Seahawks offered several draft picks as compensation to the Cardinals to complete the trade and Easley announced his retirement a few months later.

Easley filed a lawsuit against the Seahawks, their team trainer and the team doctors stating that an overdose of Advil (ibuprofen) for an ankle injury a few years before was the cause of his kidney failure. He knew as early as 1986 that there were issues with his kidney but finally realized the severity of it when he failed the Cardinals physical. Easley claimed that he took 15 to 20 Advils daily for three months to reduce the swelling in his ankle, before a doctor intervened and told him to stop. A former teammate said that Advil and other medications were easily obtainable in the Seahawks locker room in "large dispensers" without proper medical supervision. Easley's physicians claimed that they never told him to take the quantity of Advils Easley claimed he took. His case made national headlines and formed discussion involving the safe use of over the counter medication like Advil. The lawsuit was later settled out of court.

Easley received a new kidney two years later at the University of Washington Medical Center in Seattle.

After retirement
In 1991, Easley bought into a car dealership (along with partner Rick Johnson), Alderwood Oldsmobile & Cadillac in Lynnwood Washington, (which later moved to Shoreline, Washington in 1996), taking advantage of a General Motors program that made it easier for African-Americans and other minorities to own an auto dealership. The dealership became successful and Easley was named president of the African American Dealers Association.

In 1999, Easley, along with Buffalo Bills defensive end Bruce Smith, were named as the new owners of the Norfolk Nighthawks of the AF2, a semi-professional arena football league branched out from the Arena Football League. The day after the city announced Easley and Smith as owners, a controversy arose with Mark Garcea and Page Johnson, the owners of the Hampton Roads Admirals minor league hockey team, and the city of Norfolk, Virginia. Garcea and Johnson stated that they participated in the original AF2 meetings and asked the city for exclusive rights to own the franchise, providing a $5,000 down payment. Instead, the city allowed Easley and Smith to pay the league's $75,000 franchise fee. The AF2 started playing their first games in the summer of 2000. In his first season as owner, the Nighthawks averaged 6,500 fans at their home field per game, and sold 3,200 season tickets. The team made the AF2 playoffs, but lost money in their first season, which Easley blamed as "rookie mistakes" and startup costs. The team disbanded prior to the 2004 season.

Reconciliation with the Seahawks
After his retirement, Easley cut most of his ties with the Seahawks organization, citing the lawsuit, how his "dignity" was affected by the Stouffer trade, and how no one from the organization offered condolences after his kidney transplant. Fifteen years later, he received a phone call from Gary Wright, the Seahawks publicity director, saying that new owner Paul Allen wanted to induct Easley into the Ring of Honor, and that no other players would receive the honor again until he accepted. Easley saw this, as well as the fact that the old ownership group (the Nordstroms) was long gone, as an opportunity to reconcile and re-connect with the Seahawks organization. He accepted the honor and has had cordial relations with the organization since.

Easley was named an honorary captain during Super Bowl XLIX. He flipped the coin while Vince Wilfork called the toss on behalf of the captains.  The Seahawks officially retired his number 45 in 2017.

Legacy
In his seven-year career, Easley recorded 32 interceptions for 538 yards and three touchdowns, while also returning 27 punts for 302 yards. In 2002, Easley was elected to the Seattle Seahawks Ring of Honor after several attempts by the Seahawks to nominate him, but he was not interested. He was also named to the NFL 1980s All-Decade Team.

In 2012, the Professional Football Researchers Association named Easley to the PRFA Hall of Very Good Class of 2012 

In 2016, Easley was named the senior finalist for the Pro Football Hall of Fame's 2017 class, and in February 2017 he was elected, and his bust was sculpted by Scott Myers.

References

External links
 
 

1959 births
Living people
African-American players of American football
All-American college football players
American Conference Pro Bowl players
American football safeties
Chicago Bulls draft picks
College Football Hall of Fame inductees
National Football League players with retired numbers
Players of American football from Virginia
Seattle Seahawks players
Sportspeople from Chesapeake, Virginia
UCLA Bruins football players
Pro Football Hall of Fame inductees

21st-century African-American people
20th-century African-American sportspeople
National Football League Defensive Player of the Year Award winners